The 2015 Nigerian Senate election in Enugu State was held on March 28, 2015, to elect members of the Nigerian Senate to represent Enugu State. Gilbert Nnaji representing Enugu East, Ike Ekweremadu representing Enugu West and Utazi Chukwuka representing Enugu North all won on the platform of Peoples Democratic Party.

Overview

Summary

Results

Enugu East 
Peoples Democratic Party candidate Gilbert Nnaji won the election, defeating All Progressives Congress candidate Benjamin Nwoye and other party candidates.

Enugu West 
Peoples Democratic Party candidate Ike Ekweremadu won the election, defeating All Progressives Congress candidate Achieze Louisa and other party candidates.

Enugu North 
Peoples Democratic Party candidate Utazi Chukwuka won the election, defeating All Progressives Congress candidate Joseph Okoloagu and other party candidates.

References 

Enugu State Senate elections
March 2015 events in Nigeria
Enu